Alexander William Thompson (1916-2001) was an English cricketer active from 1939 to 1955 who played for Middlesex in 202 matches as a right-handed batsman and occasional off-spinner.

Notable Achievements 

 Thompson scored 7,915 runs in first-class cricket with a highest score of 158, one of five centuries.
 Thompson was awarded his county cap in 1946. 
 In 1947, he was a member of the Middlesex team that won the County Championship.

Early life 
Thompson was born in Toxteth Park, Liverpool, on 17 April 1916.

Death 
Thompson died in Illinois on 13 January 2001.

Notes

Sources
 
 
 Playfair Cricket Annual – 1948 edition

Middlesex cricketers
English cricketers
Marylebone Cricket Club cricketers
British expatriates in the United States
1916 births
2001 deaths
North v South cricketers
People from Toxteth